Paul Haarhuis and Sjeng Schalken were the defending champions but they competed with different partners that year, Haarhuis with Brian MacPhie and Schalken with Julien Boutter.

Boutter and Schalken lost in the first round to Gastón Etlis and Martín García.

Haarhuis and MacPhie lost in the final 7–6(8–6), 6–7(6–8), 6–4 against Martin Damm and Cyril Suk.

Seeds
Champion seeds are indicated in bold text while text in italics indicates the round in which those seeds were eliminated.

 Martin Damm /  Cyril Suk (champions)
 Paul Haarhuis /  Brian MacPhie (final)
 Julien Boutter /  Sjeng Schalken (first round)
 Michael Hill /  Daniel Vacek (first round)

Draw

External links
 2002 Ordina Open Men's Doubles Draw

Men's Doubles
Doubles